Screaming Eagles is a 1956 black-and-white World War II film directed by Charles F. Haas, released by Allied Artists, and starring Tom Tryon, Jan Merlin and, in her film debut, French Miss Universe 1954 runner-up Jacqueline Beer.

The story is set during the night of the Normandy invasion where the 101st Airborne Division parachutes into France. The title of the film refers to the nickname of the division based on its shoulder sleeve insignia.

The film is notable for its large cast of up-and-coming actors.

Plot
Prior to the Normandy landings, new recruits Mason, Corliss and Talbot are assigned to 1st Platoon, D Company, 502nd Parachute Infantry Regiment. Mason gets off on the wrong foot with certain members of the platoon, mainly Sgt. Forrest and Cpl. Dreef.

A few nights later, Mason gets drunk as he reads a Dear John letter from his girlfriend back home. Meanwhile the  platoon's passes into town are canceled because the men are ordered to standby for the invasion and are restricted to barracks. When the platoon returns to the barracks they find it destroyed by a drunken Mason. Platoon leader Lt. Pauling keeps Mason in the platoon and gives him another chance despite his behavior. Lt. Pauling talks to the platoon about Mason's behavior. The men also decide to take a chance on him, including Grimes, Dubrowski and Foley.

On the night of June 5, 1944, the 502nd find themselves boarding troop planes that will be flying over Normandy, marking the beginning of Operation Overlord. Serving as a jumpmaster, Sgt. Forrest instructs the men regarding the jump and their mission when on the ground. The platoon is tasked to set up roadblocks and hold a bridge along the Douve. Their drop zone is a mile beyond that of 2nd Battalion. Only seconds after the planes fly over the coast, the Germans man anti-aircraft guns and aim them toward the planes. Peterson is killed when flak hits the plane.

The platoon is misdropped but they  create a rallying point. Lt. Pauling splits his men up into three groups and they scout the area out small patrols. Mason sees a German sentry aiming his rifle at Cpl. Dreef and kills the sentry, which results in a firefight in which Cpl. Dreef is killed. Not having seen what Mason did, the others blame him for a hotheaded stunt. After the platoon meets back at their rallying point, the platoon is outraged when Dubrowski tells them what happened. After Lt. Pauling diffuses the situation, he is blinded by enemy fire. Sgt. Forrest selects Mason to take care of Lt. Pauling.

The platoon attacks a German-occupied farmhouse later that morning, resulting in the deaths of Lambert, Hernandez and Nolan. The platoon raid the farmhouse once after killing a German machine gun team. They find a German soldier Hans Schacht holding a French girl named Marianne hostage. Hans is taken prisoner and Marianne volunteers to aid Lt. Pauling. Hans informs the platoon that there are 300 German soldiers between them and the Douve.

The platoon later hijacks a German truck and forces the driver to take them to a tavern that is being used as a German headquarters. They capture a number of German soldiers and send them to a cellar. At gunpoint, Hans telephones false orders to draw German troops away from their positions. Behind the platoon’s back, Hans leaves the telephone line open so that the Germans can hear their chatter. A truckload of Germans raid are dispatched to the tavern, causing the platoon and Marianne to flee. Hans and the Germans who were sent to the cellar are killed by friendly fire. Talbot, Foley, Smith and Torren are killed by enemy fire and Mason is wounded in the arm.

The seven surviving members of the party (Mason, Lt. Pauling, Marianne, Corliss, Sgt. Forrest, Grimes and Dubrowski) escape the tavern by truck. By midday, the party links up with the rest of D Company at the bridge that they were supposed to hold. Lt. Pauling bids farewell to Marianne before him and Mason are driven to a field hospital.

Cast
 Tom Tryon as Pvt. Mason
 Jan Merlin as Lt. Pauling
 Jacqueline Beer as Marianne
 Alvy Moore as Pvt. Grimes
 Martin Milner as Pvt. Corliss
 Joe di Reda as Pvt. Dubrowski
 Mark Damon as Pvt. Lambert
 Paul Burke as Cpl. Dreef
 Pat Conway as Sgt. Forrest
 Edward G. Robinson Jr. as Pvt. Smith
 Robert Blake as Pvt. Hernandez
 Robert Boon as Hans Schacht
 Ralph Votrian as Pvt. Talbot
 Paul Smith as Pvt. Foley
 Robert Roark as Pvt. Torren
 Robert Dix as Pvt. Peterson
 Wayne Taylor as Pvt. Nolan

Production
Parts of the film were filmed at Fort Benning, Georgia. The technical advisers were Richard Haynes Case, a D-Day veteran of the 101st and Werner Klingler, a German film director who also had a role in the film. Case had also acted as an adviser to The Man in the Gray Flannel Suit the same year.

Jan Merlin recalled that he was originally supposed to play Private Mason because of his reputation for playing villains. As his character was to continually carry the blinded lieutenant who was to have been played by the much taller Tom Tryon, the men agreed to switch their roles.

See also
 List of American films of 1956
 List of World War II films
 502nd Parachute Infantry Regiment
 The Longest Day (film)

References

External links
 
 
 
 

1956 films
American black-and-white films
Operation Overlord films
American war drama films
Allied Artists films
Films directed by Charles F. Haas
Films produced by Samuel Bischoff
Films scored by Harry Sukman
Films set in the 1940s
Films set in France
Films set in England
Skydiving in fiction
1950s English-language films
1950s American films
1950s war drama films